Ormosia howii, the Hainan ormosia, is a species of flowering plant in the family Fabaceae native to southern China. It was initially found on Diaoluo Shan, Hainan Island in 1954 and then in Yangchun, Guangdong in 1957, both times in extremely small populations. The species is now apparently extinct.

References

howii
Endemic flora of China
Extinct flora of Asia
Flora of Hainan
Trees of China
Taxonomy articles created by Polbot